In Jae-keun is a South Korean politician and democracy activist. In 1985, her husband Kim Geun-tae was arrested and tortured by the government of Chun Doo-hwan for his pro-democracy activism. In 1987, In was awarded the Robert F. Kennedy Human Rights Award along with her husband for her role in publicly exposing his detention and torture. After Kim's death, she was elected as member of national assembly for Dobong A, Seoul in 2012. Dobong A was Kim's constituency from 1996 to 2008.

References

Living people
South Korean democracy activists
1953 births
People from Gyeonggi Province
Members of the National Assembly (South Korea)
Minjoo Party of Korea politicians
Gyodong In clan
Robert F. Kennedy Human Rights Award laureates